The 2015–16 Virginia Cavaliers men's basketball team represented the University of Virginia during the 2015–16 NCAA Division I men's basketball season, in their 111th season of play. The team was led by head coach Tony Bennett, in his seventh year, and played their home games at John Paul Jones Arena in Charlottesville, Virginia as members of the Atlantic Coast Conference. They finished the season 29–8, 13–5 in ACC play to finish in a tie for second place. They defeated Georgia Tech and Miami (FL) to advance to the championship game of the ACC tournament where they lost to North Carolina. They received an at-large bid to the NCAA tournament as a #1 seed where they defeated Hampton, Butler, and Iowa State to advance to the Elite Eight where they lost to fellow ACC member Syracuse.

Last season
The Cavaliers finished the 2014–15 season with a record of 30–4 overall and 16–2 in conference play, finishing in first place in the ACC for the second straight season. Despite their best regular season record in school history of 28–2, and reaching their highest national ranking since 1983, they fell in the semifinals of the ACC tournament to North Carolina, and in the NCAA Tournament Round of 32 to Michigan State.

Departures

Coaching changes
On April 1, 2015, associate head coach Ritchie McKay announced that he would be re-taking the head coaching job at Liberty, which he previously held from 2007 to 2009 until coming to Virginia. On April 17, Lindenwood head coach Brad Soderberg was hired. Soderberg had previously served as an assistant at Wisconsin alongside Tony Bennett's father Dick, and was interim head coach following the latter's retirement in 2000. On July 2, 2015, Ron Sanchez was promoted to associate head coach.

Class of 2015 signees

Diakite originally committed to the class of 2016, but at the time of his commitment stated that there was an "80-percent chance" that he could reclassify to 2015 and redshirt. On September 3, Bennett announced that Diakite was eligible to join the program.

Incoming transfers

Roster

Depth chart

Schedule 

|-
!colspan=12 style="background:#00214e; color:white;"| Non-conference regular season

|-
!colspan=12 style="background:#00214e; color:white;"| ACC regular season

  |-
!colspan=12 style="background:#00214e; color:white;"| ACC Tournament

  |-
!colspan=12 style="background:#00214e; color:white;"| NCAA tournament

Rankings

Team players drafted into the NBA

Awards and honors
 Tony Bennett
 USBWA District III Coach of the Year
 Malcolm Brogdon
 ACC Preseason Co-Player of the Year
 ACC Player of the Year (ACSMA, ACC Coaches)
 ACC Defensive Player of the Year (ACSMA, ACC Coaches)
 All-ACC First Team
 USBWA District III All-District Team
 USBWA District III Player of the Year
 Consensus First-Team All-American
 NABC Defensive Player of the Year
 Senior CLASS First-Team
 Anthony Gill
 All-ACC Third Team (ACSMA, ACC Coaches)
 NABC Allstate Good Works Team
 USBWA District III All-District Team
 London Perrantes
 All-ACC Honorable Mention (ACSMA, ACC Coaches)

References

Virginia Cavaliers men's basketball seasons
Virginia
Virginia Cavaliers men's basketball
Virginia
2016 in sports in Virginia